Francis Reusser (1 December 1942 – 10 April 2020) was a Swiss film director. He directed thirteen films since 1968. His film Derborence was entered into the 1985 Cannes Film Festival. Reusser died on 10 April 2020 after a long illness.

Selected filmography
 Anthony et Cleopatra (1964)
 Le grand soir (1976)
 Seuls (1981)
 Derborence (1985)
 War in the Highlands (1999)

Awards
 1976: Locarno Festival - Golden Leopard for Le Grand Soir
 1986: César Awards for Best French Language Film at 11th César Awards for Derborence

References

External links

 Francis Reusser at the Swiss Film Directory

1942 births
2020 deaths
Swiss film directors
Swiss screenwriters
Male screenwriters
People from Vevey